Paul Kenneth Peterson (April 13, 1915 – December 31, 1993) was an American lawyer, insurance broker and Republican politician who served as mayor of Minneapolis from 1957 to 1961.

Life and career

Peterson was born in Minneapolis, Minnesota in 1915. He attended the University of Minnesota and after graduating worked as an insurance salesman. During World War II, he served in Air Combat Intelligence with the United States Navy. After the war, Peterson became involved in politics after working with Governor Luther Youngdahl. Peterson ran for the Minnesota House of Representatives as a Republican and won, serving four terms from January 7, 1947 to January 3, 1955. While serving in the legislature, Peterson earned a law degree from the William Mitchell College of Law. From 1950 to 1953, he also chaired the Minnesota Republican Party.

After leaving the legislature, Peterson ran for mayor of Minneapolis. He won and served two terms from 1957 to 1961. His mayoralty focused on developing the city's core and demolishing neighborhoods such as the Gateway District. In 1960 he unsuccessfully ran for a seat in the United States Senate. In 1961, Peterson lost his bid for reelection to Democratic challenger Arthur Naftalin. In 1963, he ran for mayor again, and again lost to Naftalin. Peterson then entered private law practice, but also served on a number of city and state boards and commissions, and as an administrative law judge for Hennepin County, Minnesota from 1974 to 1985.

Peterson was killed in an automobile accident in Minneapolis on December 31, 1993.

References

1915 births
1993 deaths
University of Minnesota alumni
William Mitchell College of Law alumni
Mayors of Minneapolis
Republican Party members of the Minnesota House of Representatives
Businesspeople from Minnesota
Minnesota lawyers
Road incident deaths in Minnesota
20th-century American businesspeople
20th-century American politicians
20th-century American lawyers